Distant Worlds may refer to:

 "Distant Worlds", a song from the video game Final Fantasy XI
 Distant Worlds: Music from Final Fantasy, a series of concerts featuring music from the Final Fantasy video game series
 Distant Worlds (video game), a 2010 video game